Mark Sheeky (born 1972) is a Cheshire-based British artist, computer game developer, music artist, and author.

From childhood Sheeky designed and developed computer games, and began painting in 2004.

In 2010, he donated the 2008 painting "Two Roman Legionaries Discovering The God-King Albion Turned Into Stone" to the Grosvenor Museum collection, and won First Prize in the Grosvenor Art competition in 2012 for his work "The Paranoid Schizophrenia of Richard Dadd".

Radio
 ArtsLab (2016–2018)

Books

As author

As illustrator

As contributing author or illustrator

Discography

Singles
 2007: Gunstorm (collaboration with Tor James Faulkner), Cornutopia Music
 2018: House Of Glass, Cornutopia Music
 2018: Masculinity Two, Cornutopia Music

EP
 2007: Gunstorm (collaboration with Tor James Faulkner), Cornutopia Music
 2017: Finnegans Judgement, Cornutopia Music
 2018: A Walk In The Countryside, Cornutopia Music

Albums
 The Arcangel Soundtrack (2000), Cornutopia Music
 Synaesthesia (2002), REV Records
 The Incredible Journey (2002), Cornutopia Music
 The Spiral Staircase (Original) (2004), Cornutopia Music
 Animalia (2004), Pravda
 Flatspace (The Official Soundtrack) (2007), Cornutopia Music
 The Spiral Staircase (2008), Cornutopia Music
 The End And The Beginning (collaboration with Tor James Faulkner) (2009), Cornutopia Music
 The Twelve Seasons (2009), Cornutopia Music
 The Infinite Forest (2010), Cornutopia Music
 Once Upon A Time (2010), Cornutopia Music
 Pi (2010), Cornutopia Music
 Flatspace II (The Official Soundtrack) (2012), Cornutopia Music
 The Love Symphony (2012), Cornutopia Music
 Bites of Greatness (2013), Cornutopia Music
 Synaesthesia (2015), Cornutopia Music
 The Anatomy of Emotions (2016), Cornutopia Music
 Cycles & Shadows (2017), Cornutopia Music
 Genesis (2017), Cornutopia Music
 Tree Of Keys (2019), Cornutopia Music
 Music Of Poetic Objects (2019), Cornutopia Music

References

External links 

 
 Two Roman Legionaries Discovering The God-King Albion Turned Into Stone in the Public Catalogue Foundation

British surrealist artists
Indie video game developers
People from Cheshire
Living people
1972 births